José René Higuita Zapata (born 27 August 1966) is a Colombian former professional footballer who played as a goalkeeper. He was nicknamed El Loco ("The Madman") for his high-risk 'sweeper-keeper' playing style and his flair for the dramatic.

Higuita's style of play, which was first shown to a global audience during the 1990 FIFA World Cup, was pioneering in influencing goalkeepers to take more responsibility for situations farther from the goal. 

IFFHS ranked Higuita the 8th best South American keeper in history. He is also ranked as one of the 10 highest-scoring goalkeepers in history, with 41 goals overall.

Early life
Higuita was born in Medellín, Antioquia to Jorge Zapata and Maria Dioselina Higuita. His father left the family when Higuita was a child, so he was raised by his mother. His mother later died when he was very young, so he was taken care of by his grandmother.

Club career
Higuita started his playing career with Millonarios and transferred to Atlético Nacional in 1986. He played the majority of his club career with the Colombian side where he helped the team win the Colombian League on two occasions as well as the Copa Libertadores and Copa Interamericana, both in 1989. After leaving them, he moved to Spain to play with Real Valladolid for one season, before coming back to Atletico Nacional for four years. He then left for Mexico to play for Veracruz before coming back to the Colombian league to play for Atletico's city rivals, Independiente Medellín.

He briefly retired in 2005 after failing a drug test while playing for Aucas.

He came out of retirement on 21 July 2007 to sign for Venezuelan club Guaros FC. In January 2008, aged 41, he signed for Colombian second-division team Deportivo Rionegro. In June 2008 he signed for another Colombia team, Deportivo Pereira, and finally retired on 25 January 2010.

International career

Higuita's first major tournament was the 1989 Copa América, where the team was knocked out in the first round. In the 1990 FIFA World Cup, he played an important part to lead the country into the round of 16 for the first time. However, Higuita's unorthodox playing style caused a mistake by him that knocked Colombia out of the World Cup, when he tried to feint Cameroon striker Roger Milla but failed, and Milla dispossessed him and scored, which put Cameroon through to the quarter-finals. Higuita described it as "a mistake as big as a house". As a result of such behaviour, Higuita was nicknamed El Loco ("The Madman").

He played in the 1991 Copa América where the team finished fourth. His last call-up for the national team was for the 1999 Copa América.

Higuita often took set-pieces for the Colombia national team, in all, he scored three goals in his 68 international appearances.

Style of play
On the pitch, Higuita was known for his dramatic flair, composure under pressure, and eccentric playing style, often taking unnecessary risks and actively coming out of his area to anticipate opponents, play the ball out to defenders, undertake individual dribbling runs, and attempt to score goals, which led him to be described as a 'sweeper-keeper'; he was, therefore, a pioneer in influencing other goalkeepers to take more responsibility for situations farther from the goal. Although he was a goalkeeper, Higuita also became known for scoring directly from free-kicks, as well as penalties.

IFFHS ranked Higuita the 8th best keeper in South American history.

Scorpion Kick 
Furthermore, Higuita reportedly invented the scorpion kick, a movement which involves the player jumping forward, positioning their legs over their head, and in doing so, kicking the ball away with their heels; one of Higuita's most notable uses of the scorpion was when he performed it while clearing a cross from Jamie Redknapp during a friendly against England at Wembley Stadium on 6 September 1995, earning him considerable media attention. It ranked 94th in Channel 4's 100 Greatest Sporting Moments in 2002.

Coaching career
Higuita has expressed a wish to coach the Colombia national team and in December 2008 he got the job of goalkeeper coach for his former club Real Valladolid.

He joined Al Nassr FC in Saudi Arabia in 2011, and was the club goalkeeper coach for about 5 years, until 2016. 

He rejoined Atletico Nacional on 28 June 2017 after receiving a coaching job as the goalkeeping coach. Upon rejoining, he said "the dream of my life was to return to Atletico Nacional".

Personal life
Higuita was friends with Diego Maradona and played in the Argentine's farewell match in 2001.

Higuita was imprisoned in 1993 after getting involved in a kidnapping. Acting as a go-between for the drug barons Pablo Escobar and Carlos Molina, he was largely responsible for securing the release of Molina's daughter by delivering the ransom money. He received $64,000 for his services, which breaks Colombian law as it is an offence to profit from a kidnapping. He was incarcerated for seven months before being released without charge. Commenting on the case, he stated, "I'm a footballer, I didn't know anything about kidnapping laws."

In the ESPN documentary "The Two Escobars", Higuita claimed that he was arrested for visiting Pablo during his time in prison with the desire to thank him for turning himself in thus stabilizing Colombia for a short period. He supported this theory claiming that all he was asked during questioning was solely about Pablo Escobar himself and no kidnapping.

Because of the term in prison, Higuita was not fit for the 1994 FIFA World Cup. In another scandal, he tested positive for cocaine on 23 November 2004 while playing for Aucas, an Ecuadorian football club.

In 2005, Higuita participated in the reality TV program La Isla de Los famosos: Una Aventura Pirata ("The Island of the Famous: A Pirate Adventure"), a show similar to Survivor. Also in 2005, he underwent plastic surgery to completely change his appearance.

Higuita has expressed the wish to become more politically active.

Career statistics

List of goals scored 
 Higuita scored 43 goals at a professional level: From the list of goalscoring goalkeepers, Higuita is currently (as of 2022) in position five of the most goal-scoring goalkeepers after Johnny Vegas Fern. 
Penalties (35), free kicks (7) and one goal scored by his area. 
Clubs (40), International (3)
Primera División de Colombia (31), Primera División de México (2), Segunda División de Colombia (2), Copa Libertadores (5), Friendly matches with Colombia (2), Copa América (1).

Honours
Atlético Nacional
Copa Libertadores: 1989; runner-up 1995
Copa Interamericana: 1989
Intercontinental Cup: runner-up 1989
Colombian League: 1991, 1994

Colombia
Copa América Third place: 1993, 1995

Individual
South American Team of the Year: 1989, 1990
Golden Foot Legends Award: 2009

See also
 List of doping cases in sport
 List of goalscoring goalkeepers

References

External links

 
 International statistics at rsssf
 Rene Higuita Career Info and Achievements
 FIFA interview with René Higuita
 BBC SPORT Tim Vickery The legacy of Rene Higuita
 René Higuita clips: Part 1; Part 2; Part 3; Part 4

1966 births
Living people
Footballers from Medellín
Association football goalkeepers
Colombian footballers
Colombia under-20 international footballers
Colombia international footballers
1990 FIFA World Cup players
1987 Copa América players
1989 Copa América players
1991 Copa América players
1995 Copa América players
1999 Copa América players
Millonarios F.C. players
Atlético Nacional footballers
Real Valladolid players
C.D. Veracruz footballers
Independiente Medellín footballers
Real Cartagena footballers
Atlético Junior footballers
Deportivo Pereira footballers
S.D. Aucas footballers
Asociación Civil Deportivo Lara players
Leones F.C. footballers
Copa Libertadores-winning players
Colombian expatriate footballers
Expatriate footballers in Ecuador
Expatriate footballers in Mexico
Expatriate footballers in Spain
Expatriate footballers in Venezuela
Categoría Primera A players
La Liga players
Liga MX players
Doping cases in association football
Colombian sportspeople in doping cases
Colombian people of African descent
Guaros F.C. players